David Constantine Brooks (born 30 November 1980), better known by his stage name Mavado, is a Jamaican dancehall singer, who is signed to We the Best Music Group and formerly to Cash Money Records.

Biography
David Constantine Brooks was raised in Kingston, Jamaica's Cassava Piece community. He cites the music of Bounty Killer as an early influence. Bounty took him under his wing to show him the ropes of the music industry and introduced him to his manager, Julian Jones-Griffith. He decided to name himself "Mavado" after the Swiss watch company Movado, with his manager altering the spelling.

In 2005, Mavado had his breakthrough with his first single, "Real McKoy". He further established himself with the follow-up record "Weh Dem a Do", on the Red Bull & Guinness riddim, that had the distinction of hitting Billboard. After a string of hits in 2005 and 2006, Mavado released the album Gangsta for Life: The Symphony of David Brooks 10 July 2007 on VP Records. The single "Dying" from the album was featured heavily on New York's WQHT (Hot 97) R&B/hip-hop radio station.

That same year brought Mavado off-stage controversy, as he was detained by Jamaican police. While in police custody, the singer claims he was thrown through a glass window, slicing three fingers in the process, which were reattached at a local hospital. Police claimed Mavado escaped from custody while at the hospital. He was later arrested and charged with shooting with intent and illegal possession of firearm in relation to an event occurring 27 July 2007. Mavado was released two days later on a $3000 bail and was subsequently refused entry into the United States.

Mavado did not sign the Reggae Compassionate Act and has been criticised for anti-gay lyrics (in such songs as ''Batty Bwoy Termination'' where the lyrics say "Battyboy must die, Lesbian must die, Sodomite must die"), as well as alleged promotion of gun violence. The issue caused him to be banned at times from several Caribbean countries.

In March 2008, Mavado was featured performing a rendition of his song "Real McKoy" for Grand Theft Auto IV Trailer #4 "Everyone's a Rat". "Real McKoy", along with "Last Night" (both from the album Gangsta for Life), were also featured in the game on the radio station "Massive B Radio". Mavado was also featured on the G-Unit track 'Let It Go' along with Tony Yayo and Lloyd Banks for the album: T·O·S (Terminate on Sight) in 2008. He was the only non-G-Unit feature on the album. In 2008 Mavado was given the UK MOBO Award for Best Reggae Act.

In April 2010, Mavado starred in a music video as a gangster in Drake's song "Find Your Love" for Drake's album Thank Me Later. Mavado formed his own label, Mansion Records, in 2011, which debuted with the single "Delilah".
Along with Bounty Killer, he has cited 2Pac as a childhood idol, comparing the late rapper's life to his own.

In 2011, Mavado recorded with U.K. grime artist Chipmunk on the track "Every Gyal". On 1 September 2011, Mavado appeared on the Angie Martinez show on New York's Hot 97 radio station to announce that he had signed a deal with DJ Khaled's record label We the Best Music Group. Mavado released three singles "Emergency" featuring Ace Hood, Soulja girl and "Survivor" featuring Akon on We the Best Music Group.

In May 2012 he was convicted of assault occasioning actual bodily harm and malicious destruction of property after a driving incident, and was fined a total of $100,000. An appeal against the sentence was unsuccessful. In 2012, it was announced that Mavado would feature in a "Shottas 2" a sequel to the Shottas movie, which had starred Ky-Mani Marley and Spragga Benz.

In 2016, Mavado's song "Progress" on the Mineral Boss Records produced "Money Boss Riddim" was featured in DJ Khaled's Major Key album. The album was nominated for the 2017 Grammy Awards on the "best rap" album category. In 2017, Mavado, Alkaline and Jahmiel formed a camp known as MVP, which Mavado claimed to be the "biggest thing" in dancehall at that time.

In 2018, Mavado collaborated with Sean Paul for an inspirational song called "I'm Sanctify". In 2019, Mavado released a song called "Top Shotta Is Back" On a Riddim called The Aircraft Riddim produced by Chimney Records.

In 2020, Mavado recorded and released a Drake diss song called "Enemy Line".

Discography

Albums

2007: Gangsta for Life: The Symphony of David Brooks
2009: Mr. Brooks...A Better Tomorrow

Singles

As lead artist
 "Weh Dem Ah Do" (2007)
 "Real McKoy" (2007)
 "Lost Dem" (2011)
 "Do Road" (2011)
 "Take It" featuring Karian Sang (2012)
 "Give It All to Me" featuring Nicki Minaj (2013)
 "Million Dollar Man" (2013)
 "Tie Yuh" (2014)
 "Ben Ova" (2014)
 "My Pan " (2014)
 "Ain't Going Back Broke" featuring Future and Ace Hood (2015)
 "Ghetto Bible" (2015)
 "My League" (2015)
 "Big League" (2016)
 "Progress" (2016)
 "Mama" (2017)
 "Red Rose" (2017)
 "Dress to Impress" (2018)
 "Enemies" (2018)
 "I'm Sanctify" featuring Sean Paul (2018)
 "Father God" (2018)
 "Enemy Lines" (2020)

As featured artist

External links

References

1981 births
Living people
Cash Money Records artists
Dancehall singers
Hip hop singers
Jamaican male singers
Jamaican reggae singers
Musicians from Kingston, Jamaica
Ragga musicians
Reggae fusion artists
VP Records artists